The Chief of Defence (CDS) is the highest-ranking military officer in the Armed forces of the Netherlands and is the principal military advisor to the Minister of Defence. On behalf of the Minister of Defence, he is responsible for operational policy, strategic planning and for preparing and executing military operations carried out by the Armed forces. The Chief of Defence is in charge of the central staff and is the direct commanding officer of all the commanders of the branches of the Armed forces. In this capacity the Chief of Defence directs all the activities of the Royal Netherlands Army, the Royal Netherlands Navy and Royal Netherlands Air Force. He is also in charge of the Royal Netherlands Marechaussee, when it is operating under the responsibility of the Minister of Defence.

Responsibilities
The main role of the Chief of Defence is as an intermediary between the Minister of Defence and the Central Staff of the Armed Forces of The Netherlands. He makes operational policy and is responsible to the minister for military-strategic planning, operations and deployment of the Armed Forces. The Chief of Defence is the direct commanding officer of the commanders of the branches of the Armed forces.

 The Commander of the Royal Netherlands Army
 The Commander of the Royal Netherlands Air Force
 The Commander of the Royal Netherlands Navy

The branch commanders are responsible for preparedness and actual deployment of their military personnel in the Netherlands and the rest of the world. Regarding operational planning and deployment, the branch commanders take their orders directly from the Chief of Defence.

There is a fourth branch of the military, the Royal Marechaussee (Gendarmerie). This branch does not answer to the Chief of Defence, since it is the police force for the entirety of the Armed Forces. This requires that the Marechaussee be independent, so this branch took its orders directly from the Secretary-general for the Ministry of Defence. The current  Secretary-General is Wim Geerts.

In addition to his command tasks, the Chief of Defence is the senior military advisor to the Minister of Defence.

The current position of Chief of Defence (CHOD) is new since 5 September 2005, when it replaced the existing role of Chef-Defensiestaf (Chief of the Defence Staff) and was abbreviated as CDS. Just like its predecessor role the position of Chief of Defence will rotate between the branches of the military; the first Chief of Defence was General Dick Berlijn, of the Royal Netherlands Air Force. The position of Chief of Defence is held by a Four-star officer (NATO OF-9, meaning a General or a Lieutenant admiral), which means that promotion to the position of Chief of Defence includes a promotion in rank as well as there is only one four-star officer in the current command structure.

On 24 February 2017 the Ministry of Defence announced that Vice-admiral Rob Bauer will be the next Chief of Defence 

On 3 October 2017 the chief of defence General Tom Middendorp resigned after severe problems with the Dutch defence, on 5 October 2017 he is succeeded by Lieutenant admiral Rob Bauer

List of Chiefs of the Defence Staff / Chiefs of Defence

Commander-in-chief of the Armed forces (1914–1949)

|-style="text-align:center;"
|colspan=7|Vacant  Interbellum
|-

|-style="text-align:center;"
|colspan=7|Vacant  German occupation
|-

Chairman of the United Defence Staff (1949–1976)

Chiefs of the Defence Staff (1976–2005)

Chiefs of the Defence (2005–present)

List of Vice Chiefs of Defence

References

External links
Official
  Ministry of Defence Ministry of Defence

 
Netherlands